Gibasoides is a genus of monocotyledonous flowering plants in the dayflower family, first described as a genus in 1978. The genus consists of a single species, Gibasoides laxiflora endemic to Mexico (Puebla, Morelos, Nayarit, Jalisco, Michoacán, Oaxaca).

References

External links

Commelinaceae
Monotypic Commelinales genera
Endemic flora of Mexico